El Grand Prix del verano is a Spanish prime-time television game show created by Francesco Boserman and produced by Europroducciones. It was broadcast on La Primera Cadena of Televisión Española from 1995 to 2005 and on some channels of the FORTA association since 2007.

External links
  Official webpage in English
  Webpage dedicated to this TV program

References

Spanish game shows
RTVE shows